Pedro Aleixo (1 August 1901 – 3 March 1975) served as President of the Chamber of Deputies in 1937 and as the 16th vice president of Brazil from 15 March 1967 to 14 October 1969.

As President of the Chamber of Deputies he witnessed the coup d'état that installed the dictatorship of the Estado Novo in Brazil.

Aleixo was the last vice president to hold the office of President of the Senate. As vice president, he was the designate to succeed Artur da Costa e Silva after he became incapacitated due to disease, but Aleixo was removed from the vice presidency on 6 October 1969 by the Brazilian Military Junta of 1969, which took the acting presidency instead.

In 2011, pursuant to Law Nº 12.486, dated 12 September, Aleixo was included in the gallery of those who were anointed by the Brazilian Nation to the Supreme Magistracy. This means that he should be considered an ex-president, for all legal purposes.

References

Notes

|-

|-

1901 births
1975 deaths
People from Minas Gerais
Republican Party of Minas Gerais politicians
National Democratic Union (Brazil) politicians
National Renewal Alliance politicians
Vice presidents of Brazil
Presidents of the Chamber of Deputies (Brazil)
Education Ministers of Brazil

Candidates for Vice President of Brazil